Smíchovské nádraží is a Prague Metro station on Line B. It serves the Smíchov railway station. The station was opened on 2 November 1985, as the southern terminus of the inaugural section of Line B between Sokolovská and Smíchovské nádraží. On 26 October 1988, Line B was extended further to Nové Butovice.

References

Prague Metro stations
Railway stations opened in 1985
1985 establishments in Czechoslovakia
Smíchov
Railway stations in the Czech Republic opened in the 20th century